Epizelus (Greek: Ἐπίζηλος), the son of Cuphagoras (Greek: Κουφάγoρας) was an Athenian soldier who fought at the Battle of Marathon in 490 BCE.

The only author to mention this individual is Herodotus in his Histories:

The description suggests that Epizelus suffered from hysterical blindness (referred to as a conversion disorder).

References

Year of birth missing
Year of death missing
5th-century BC Athenians
Battle of Marathon
Athenians of the Greco-Persian Wars